Concord is a small unincorporated community in Lauramie Township, Tippecanoe County, Indiana, located just west of Stockwell.

The community is part of the Lafayette, Indiana Metropolitan Statistical Area.

History

A post office was established at Concord in 1837, and remained in operation until it was discontinued in 1868.

Geography

Concord is located in Lauramie Township around the intersection of county roads 350 East and 900 South, about four miles south of Lafayette.  Wea Creek is along the west side of Concord, and the creek's east branch is along the south; the two meet just west of town and flow generally northwest to the Wabash.  The town has an elevation of 732 feet.

County Road S. 350 East is also known as Concord Road, which is the street it becomes upon entering Lafayette; within Concord this road used to be known as Main Street.  The town originally had two other north–south streets farther west (Mulberry and Poplar) as well as four east–west streets: Hickory, Elm, Main-Cross, and Walnut.

References

Unincorporated communities in Tippecanoe County, Indiana
Unincorporated communities in Indiana
Lafayette metropolitan area, Indiana